Schwartziella minima is a species of minute sea snail, a marine gastropod mollusk or micromollusk in the family Zebinidae. The species name minima is Latin and refers to the small size of the shell.

Description
The length of the shell is up to 2.8 mm, maximum width 1.3 mm.

Distribution
This species occurs in the Atlantic Ocean off the Cape Verdes.

References

 Rolán E., 2005. Malacological Fauna From The Cape Verde Archipelago. Part 1, Polyplacophora and Gastropoda.

minima
Gastropods of Cape Verde
Gastropods described in 2000